Vinux is a Linux distribution which has been specially designed for blind and partially sighted users. Specifically it is a remastered version of the Ubuntu distribution and provides users with two screen readers, two full-screen magnifiers, global font-size and colour changing facilities. The system also supports USB Braille displays.

Vinux was originally developed in 2008 by Tony Sales, Technical Support at the Royal National College for the Blind in Hereford, United Kingdom. It was first listed on DistroWatch on 1 June 2010 as Vinux 3.0.

Features 
Vinux allows blind and visually impaired computer users to install a version of Ubuntu independently. It includes Orca (a screen reader and magnifier), Speakup (a console screen reader), Compiz (a magnifier based on 3d technology), and support for Braille displays. Braille displays operate automatically when connected and support grade 1 and 2 Braille. Vinux can run from a live CD or live USB without making any changes to a current operating system. It can be installed to a USB or hard drive alongside a current operating system or as a complete replacement.

References

External links 
 
 Vinux Build Scripts
 Vinux Documentation
 

Royal National College for the Blind
Disability software
Blindness equipment
Ubuntu derivatives
Linux distributions